Ribera d'Urgellet is a municipality in the comarca of the Alt Urgell in Catalonia, Spain. It includes a small exclave to the west.

References

External links
 Government data pages 

Municipalities in Alt Urgell